Anuket was the Ancient Egyptian goddess of the cataracts of the Nile.

Anuket may also refer to:

 Anuket Vallis ('Anuket Valley'), a geological feature on Venus
 MS River Anuket, a Nile River cruise ship involved in the COVID-19 pandemic on cruise ships

See also